Serradilla is a municipality located in the province of Cáceres, Extremadura, Spain.  The population was 1,832 at the 2004 census (INE).

In 2013, the residents of Serradilla created the first feature film in the Extremaduran language, Territoriu de bandolerus (Territory of bandits). The monthly review El Migajon is also published in Serradilla.

References

Municipalities in the Province of Cáceres